Capitalism is Cannibalism is a 1982 song and EP by the British anarcho-punk band Anthrax. It was considered by many "the band's defining moment." The title comes from a speech by Eugene Victor Debs. It reached No.9 in the UK Indie Hit list and was placed for 10 weeks.

Track list
A1 Capitalism Is Cannibalism 
2 Violence Is Violence
B1 Prime To Pension 
2 All Things Bright And Beautiful

References

External links
 Punky Gibbon

1982 songs